Gordon Scott Durie (born on 6 December, 1965 in Paisley) is the Scottish former professional footballer, a utility player who usually played as a striker. He played for East Fife, Hibernian, Chelsea, Tottenham Hotspur, Rangers and Hearts. He was also capped 43 times by Scotland. After retiring as a player in 2001, in 2010, he became a coach and manager, working for East Fife and Rangers as an assistant.

Playing career 
Durie started his senior career with East Fife, and he then moved to Hibernian in 1984; while still in his teens, he played on the losing side in the 1985 Scottish League Cup Final with Hibs, who sold him to Chelsea for £400,000 in 1986.

His spell with Chelsea from 1986 to 1991, yielded 63 goals in total from 153 appearances, and they won the Football League Second Division in 1989. in 1991, Durie moved to Tottenham Hotspur for a £2.2 million fee. Durie scored on his debut in a 3–2 away win at The Dell versus Southampton. He was also their first goalscorer in the Premier League, in a 2–2 home draw with Crystal Palace on 22 August 1992.

The forward them joined boyhood favourites Rangers in November 1993 <refname=spur>A £1.2m spur as Rangers get the Durie's verdict</ref> 
and Durie played a major role in winning the last four of their 'nine in a row' of Scottish league championships and playing a handful of matches in two later title wins. Durie scored a hat-trick in the 1996 Scottish Cup Final to help Rangers beat Hearts 5–1 and collected runners-up medals in the competition in 1994 and 1998; he was a Scottish League Cup winner in 1998.

Durie left Rangers at the end of the 1999–2000 season after 179 appearances and 52 goals. After turning down an offer from Australia, Durie signed for Hearts in September 2000. He stayed there for the rest of the 2000–01 season, after which he retired from playing.

International career
Durie made his international debut for Scotland on 11 November, 1987, in a 1–0 against Bulgaria. He was capped 43 times in all, scoring seven goals. He was one of Scotland's bright spots in their team at Euro '96. And Durie scored the second goal in a 2–0 win against Latvia that clinched qualification for the 1998 FIFA World Cup. The last time he played for the Scottish team was during that World Cup, in a 3–0 defeat against Morocco.

Coaching career 
Durie was appointed assistant manager of East Fife in November 2010. On 1 March, 2012, he was made caretaker manager at Bayview following the departure of John Robertson. Durie took the job on a longer term basis, but then suffered from ill health. He resigned in November 2012, due to this illness.

Durie joined the Rangers coaching staff in July 2013, to work with the reserve and under-20 teams. He was promoted to a first team coaching role in December 2014, following the departure of manager Ally McCoist. Durie left Rangers in July 2015, as new manager Mark Warburton made changes to the coaching staff.

Personal life 
His son, Scott, was a youth player at Rangers and signed for East Fife in 2010.

Durie was declared bankrupt in 2016.

Career statistics

International goals 
Scores and results list Scotland's goal tally first.

Honours
Individual
PFA Team of the Year: 1988–89 Second Division

References

External links 

International Appearances at londonhearts.com Scotland section

1965 births
Living people
1990 FIFA World Cup players
1998 FIFA World Cup players
Chelsea F.C. players
East Fife F.C. players
Association football forwards
Heart of Midlothian F.C. players
Hibernian F.C. players
Footballers from Paisley, Renfrewshire
Premier League players
Rangers F.C. players
Scotland B international footballers
Scotland international footballers
Scottish footballers
Scottish Football League players
Scottish Premier League players
English Football League players
Tottenham Hotspur F.C. players
UEFA Euro 1992 players
UEFA Euro 1996 players
People educated at Inverkeithing High School
Scotland under-21 international footballers
Scottish football managers
East Fife F.C. managers
Scottish Football League managers
Rangers F.C. non-playing staff